Blackjack (also known as John Woo's Blackjack) is a 1998 Canadian-American made-for-television action film and an unsuccessful pilot directed by John Woo and starring Dolph Lundgren as a leukophobic former United States Marshal turned bodyguard who hunts down an assassin.

Plot
After crime boss Kamenev (Géza Kovács) threatens his daughter Casey (Padraigin Murphy), casino owner Bobby Stern (Peter Keleghan) calls in his friend, retired U.S. Marshal Jack Devlin (Dolph Lundgren), to protect her. Devlin fends off a squadron of Kamenev's henchmen sent to abduct Casey from the Stern mansion, but is temporarily blinded by a flashbang grenade in the process, and shot in the leg. While Jack and Casey survive, Devlin develops a debilitating phobia of the color white (leukophobia) due to the traumatic experience of being blinded by bright white light while fighting for his life.

Some time later, back home in New York City with his roommate/sidekick Thomas (Saul Rubinek), Jack is receiving treatment for his phobia from psychiatrist Dr. Rachel Stein (Kate Vernon). A lawyer arrives at Devlin's apartment, telling him that Bobby Stern and his wife have died in an accident, and that Jack is now Casey's legal guardian. Shortly after this, Jack's old friend, fellow retired U.S. Marshal Tim Hastings (Fred Williamson), is badly wounded while protecting a rising-star fashion model, Cinder James (Kam Heskin) from an insane, obsessive killer (Phillip MacKenzie), and left comatose in the hospital. Jack takes on Tim's job as bodyguard out of loyalty to his friend. Jack now has to juggle his duty as father figure to Casey, coping with his leukophobia, his difficult personal relationship with Cinder, and his rivalry with fellow bodyguard Don Tragle (Andrew Jackson), all while protecting Cinder from further assassination attempts.

Jack discovers that the killer is, in fact, Cinder's deranged, abusive ex-husband, Rory Gaines, a failed actor. Jack and Thomas manage to track Gaines to an abandoned distillery but, forewarned of their arrival, Gaines manages to incapacitate both of them and tie them up. Gaines comes close to murdering Thomas, but Jack manages to cut through his bonds in time to save him. Gaines exploits Jack's leukophobia to escape once more. Tragle conspires with Cinder's manager, Derek Smythe (Albert Schultz), to seize control of the bodyguard agency, forcing Jack out of his job, and leaving Cinder dangerously exposed at a big fashion show.

Jack manages to gain entry to the event, and keeps Cinder covered with a rifle as she walks the catwalk. Gaines appears in disguise as one of the fashion show's costumed performers, and shoots a pistol, then draws attention to Jack- who is there illicitly, and armed- to create a distraction, allowing him to abduct Cinder, who he takes back to his distillery hideout. Gaines compels Cinder to have "one last dance" with him; as he is about to stab her, Jack appears and engages Gaines in a shootout. Overcoming his leukophobia- the room is hung with white curtains- Jack shoots Gaines dead, saving Cinder. Some time later, Tim has recovered from his wounds; Jack and Cinder part ways with a kiss, and go their separate ways.

Cast

 Dolph Lundgren as U.S. Marshal Jack Devlin
 Kate Vernon as Dr. Rachel Stein
 Phillip MacKenzie as Rory Gaines
 Kam Heskin as Cinder James
 Fred Williamson as Tim Hastings
 Andrew Jackson as Don Tragle
 Padraigin Murphy as Casey
 Tony De Santis as Detective Trini
 Albert Schultz as Derek Smythe
 Janet Bailey as Connie Hastings
 Saul Rubinek as Thomas

Production
The film was intended as a backdoor pilot for a television series, but was not picked up. Its September 15, 1998 showing on the USA Network garnered a 2.7 national rating.

Reception

Critical response
TV Guide reviewed the film at 2 stars out of 4 and noted: "Though it boasts several rousing action sequences, the film is sabotaged by lackluster acting, thin characterization, and a derivative storyline."

References

External links

1998 television films
1998 films
1998 action films
1990s American films
1990s Canadian films
1990s English-language films
American action television films
Canadian action films
Canadian television films
English-language Canadian films
Films about bodyguards
Films directed by John Woo
Films scored by Micky Erbe
Films scored by Maribeth Solomon
Television pilots not picked up as a series
USA Network original films